The Brazilian Astronomical Society (in Portuguese: Sociedade Astronômica Brasileira - SAB) is a professional astronomical society in Brazil, founded in 1974.

According to its statute, the society is obliged to fulfill certain duties:

 Congregate Brazil's astronomers; 
 Uphold the freedom to scientific research and education; 
 Uphold astronomers' rights and interests; 
 Support national science's prestige; 
 Stimulate national astronomy's research and teaching; 
 Maintain contact with similar institutes and societies, both national and abroad;
 Promote scientific meetings, courses and conferences;  
 Publish and update a scientific bulletin about the society's activities and general news about astronomy.

In addition to symposia, working meetings and contact services, it also holds annual meetings, which have taken place in:

Teaching Comission 
The Brazilian Astronomical Society Teaching Commission (Comissão de Ensino da Sociedade Astronômica Brasileira - CESAB) is assigned to analyze and correct educational books' potential inaccuracies on astronomy, in cooperation with the Ministry of Education (Ministério da Educação - MEC). The commission is also responsible for the organizing of the Brazilian Astronomy Olympiad and the periodic realization of astronomy courses destinated for teachers, in addition to the frequent production and publishing of articles and texts with the objective to promote and teach astronomy, such as the Brazilian Astronomy Magazine (Revista Brasileira de Astronomia - RBA), published quarterly.

See also 

 List of Brazilian scientific societies associated with the SBPC

References

External links 

 Official Site of the Brazilian Astronomical Society (in Portuguese)

Astronomy societies
Astronomy in Brazil